Jade Healy is a Canadian production designer based in Los Angeles. She is known for her production design work on the films The Green Knight, Marriage Story, A Ghost Story, and I, Tonya.

Career
Healy began her career as an assistant producer on Asia Argento's The Heart Is Deceitful Above All Things and then produced M. Blash's Lying. She has collaborated with film directors David Lowery, Ti West, Yorgos Lanthimos, Noah Baumbach, and Marielle Heller, among other directors.

Filmography
As Production designer

 2022 – Peter Pan & Wendy
 2021 – The Green Knight
 2019 – A Beautiful Day in the Neighborhood
 2019 – Marriage Story
 2017 – I, Tonya
 2017 – The Killing of a Sacred Deer
 2017 – A Ghost Story
 2016 – Pete's Dragon
 2016 – In a Valley of Violence
 2015 – Mississippi Grind
 2015 – James White
 2014 – Jessabelle
 2014 – Song One
 2013 – The Last of Robin Hood
 2013 – The Sacrament

 2013 – Sunlight Jr.
 2013 – Chlorine
 2013 – Ain't Them Bodies Saints
 2012 – The Normals
 2012 – Best Man Down
 2012 – Liberal Arts
 2011 – Detachment
 2011 – When Harry Tries to Marry
 2011 – The Dish & the Spoon
 2011 – The Innkeepers
 2010 – Happythankyoumoreplease
 2009 – The House of the Devil
 2009 – Alexander the Last

As Set decorator

 2009 – Cabin Fever 2: Spring Fever
 2009 – The Good Guy
 2009 – Rosencrantz and Guildenstern Are Undead

 2008 – Death in Love
 2008 – Hell Ride
 2007 – The Blue Hour

Awards and nominations

References

External links
 

Living people
Canadian production designers
Canadian art directors
Year of birth missing (living people)
Women production designers